Qanuni is a surname. Notable people with the surname include:

Jalal Qanuni (1900–?), Iranian classical musician
Yunus Qanuni (born 1957), Afghan politician

See also
Qanun (disambiguation)